Archipialea is a genus of small-headed flies in the family Acroceridae. It is endemic to Chile.

Species
 Archipialea chilensis Schlinger, 1973
 Archipialea irwini Schlinger, 1973
 Archipialea penai Schlinger, 1973
 Archipialea setipennis Schlinger, 1973

References

Acroceridae
Diptera of South America
Arthropods of Chile
Endemic fauna of Chile